Faruk Ochimi (born 19 December 1995) is a Ugandan former cricketer. He played for Uganda in the 2014 Cricket World Cup Qualifier tournament in New Zealand. However, Ochimi and team-mate Raymond Otim did not return to Uganda with their team when the tournament ended, and remained in New Zealand where they sought asylum. Both players planned to travel to Australia to play with other Ugandan cricketers in the country. However, before reaching Australia, both cricketers turned themselves in to the New Zealand authorities.

References

1995 births
Living people
Ugandan cricketers
Cricketers from Kampala